Ryan McNeil Lamswood (born March 19, 2000) is a Canadian curler from St. John's, Newfoundland and Labrador. He currently skips his own team on the World Curling Tour.

Career
McNeil Lamswood competed in five Canadian Junior Curling Championships in his junior career in 2015, 2016, 2018, 2019 and 2020. His best result came in 2020 playing third for Daniel Bruce with Joel Krats at second and Nathan King at lead. The team finished the round robin and championship pool with an 8–2 record, which qualified them for the playoffs. They defeated Rylan Kleiter of Saskatchewan in the semifinal before coming up short to Jacques Gauthier's Manitoba rink in the final. It was the first time since 2011 that Newfoundland and Labrador qualified for the playoffs. Also in his junior career, McNeil Lamswood won a silver medal at the 2019 U Sports/Curling Canada University Curling Championships as second for Greg Blyde and skipped the Newfoundland and Labrador team to a fourth-place finish at the 2018 Canadian U18 Curling Championships.

In 2020, McNeil Lamswood spared on the Brad Gushue team at the 2020 Stu Sells 1824 Halifax Classic as Geoff Walker was unable to attend due to the COVID-19 pandemic in Canada. The team made it all the way to the final where they defeated Matthew Manuel to win the event. Also during the 2020–21 season, McNeil Lamswood skipped his own team in the 2021 Newfoundland and Labrador Tankard. After going 6–1 in the round robin, they came up short to Colin Thomas in the semifinal.

In 2021, McNeil Lamswood picked up Aaron Feltham to play in the lead position for the quartet. They beat Team Nathan Young to become the team to represent the Memorial University Seahawks at the 2022 Atlantic University Sport Curling Championships. They ended up placing runner-up to the Dalhousie Tigers team. In the 2022 Newfoundland and Labrador Tankard the team failed to qualify for the play-offs; finishing with a 3-5 record.

Personal life
McNeil Lamswood is currently a communications student at Memorial University of Newfoundland.

Teams

References

External links

2000 births
Living people
Canadian male curlers
Curlers from Newfoundland and Labrador
People from Stephenville, Newfoundland and Labrador
Memorial University of Newfoundland alumni